Murgisca diplommatalis is a species of snout moth in the genus Murgisca. It is found in Panama.

References

Moths described in 1914
Chrysauginae